Rush Lake is an unincorporated community located in the town of Nepeuskun, Winnebago County, Wisconsin, United States. Rush Lake is located to the east of the community, and the Mascoutin Valley State Trail runs through Rush Lake.

References

Unincorporated communities in Winnebago County, Wisconsin
Unincorporated communities in Wisconsin